Christine Dorothy Brunton (11 October 1890 – 5 June 1977), (some sources have "Christina") generally known as Dorothy Brunton or "Dot" was an Australian singer, dancer and actress prominent in musical comedy from 1915 to the mid-1930s.

Biography
Her father, John Brunton (15 May 1849 – 22 July 1909), was a scenic painter in Scottish theatres before working in Australia with J. C. Williamson, George Coppin and Bland Holt. Her mother English-born Cecily Christina (née Neilsen) was an actress. Dorothy was born shortly after their arrival in Australia.

She was educated at Presbyterian Ladies' College in Burwood, Victoria. and at Alford House, Sydney.

Her stage advancement was the stuff of Hollywood cliche: travelling around Australia and New Zealand with her father touring with the 1908 production The White Heather in his job as scene painter for Bland Holt, her singing talents being recognised by Grace Miller Ward, wife of Hugh J. Ward and developed towards musical theatre; picking up dancing skills from a famous teacher, Jennie Brenan, acting as understudy and triumphantly filling the role when the star becomes ill, even taking parts she hadn't studied.

Her first major engagement So Long Letty (1915–16) was with J. C. Williamson ("The Firm") to whom she stayed remarkably loyal. Other roles around this time were in High Jinks, Tonight's the Night, Canary Cottage, The Girl in the Taxi, Nellie Kelly and The Rise of Rosie O'Reilly. In 1916 she appeared in a movie Seven Keys to Baldpate for J. C. Williamson Films.

She left for America in 1917, where she played in Follow the Girl then London (to the delight of Australian troops on leave), where she made a successful appearance in Shanghai at Drury Lane.

She returned to Australia in 1920, playing in Yes Uncle! and Baby Bunting. She played for Hugh J. Ward 1924 and 1925, then The Climax for Hugh D. McIntosh in 1927, which "bombed" in London. Her "leading man" was frequently Guy Bates Post.

Selected performances
22 Apr 1908 The White Heather at Theatre Royal, Adelaide for Bland Holt
1914 Gypsy Love
1915 Hi Jinks
1915 The Girl in the Taxi
1916 So Long Letty
Dec 1917 The Waltz Dream at Her Majesty's Theatre, Sydney for J. C. Williamson's New Comic Opera Company
28 Aug 1918 Shanghai at Drury Lane Theatre as "Fan Tan"
27 Oct 1923– Tons of Money at New Palace Theatre, Melbourne
27 Jun 1925– Little Jessie James at Grand Opera House, Sydney
–19 Nov 1925 The Music Box at Grand Opera House, Sydney
–25 June 1926 The Climax at Perth, Western Australia
20 June–14 July 1931 season Dearest Enemy, The Duchess of Danzig for J. C. Williamson at Theatre Royal, Adelaide
18 July 1931– season Dearest Enemy for J.C. Williamson in Perth, followed by The Duchess of Danzig and The Merry Widow
Clara Gibbings (1934) – feature film for F. W. Thring

Personal
Dorothy married businessman Ben Dawson in 1931. They moved to London in 1934; she returned to Australia in 1949 after the death of her husband. She had been badly injured in the London bombing and was suffering the effects of Parkinson's disease. She lived alone with a companion and died on 5 June 1977 at a hospice in Sydney and was cremated.

Family connection, if any, between Dorothy and fellow actress Barbara Brunton (1927–2014) has yet to be found. Dorothy's father was John Brunton (c. 1848– 22 July 1909), born in Scotland. Barbara's grandfather James Gibb (–c. 1949) married Mary Brunton ( –1952) on 4 July 1891. Barbara's father James Gibb (13 January 1897 – 28 June 1968) changed his name to James Brunton Gibb before he married Ethel Isabel Lang (1902 – November 1995) on 1 September 1923.

References

External links

Article on Dorothy Brunton at History of Australia Theatre website
Dorothy Brunton Australian theatre credits at AusStage

1890 births
1977 deaths
Australian musical theatre actresses
People educated at the Presbyterian Ladies' College, Melbourne
20th-century Australian women singers
Australian people of Scottish descent
Actresses from Sydney
20th-century Australian actresses
Australian people of English descent